Count Carl Johan Wachtmeister (1 February 1903 – 22 May 1993) was a Swedish Army officer and fencer. He served as commanding officer of Norrland Dragoon Regiment (1952–1957) and the Stockholm Defence District (1957–1963).

Career
Wachtmeister was born on 1 February 1903 in Skövde, Sweden, the son of lieutenant colonel, count Fredrik Wachtmeister and his wife Greta Lindström. He was commissioned as an officer after graduating from the Royal Military Academy in 1925 with the rank of fänrik. He attended the Royal Central Gymnastics Institute from 1928 to 1930 and the Royal Swedish Army Staff College from 1937 to 1939. Wachtmeister was promoted to ryttmästare in the Life Regiment Hussars (K 3) in 1940 and to captain of the General Staff Corps in 1942. He then served as Aide-de-camp to His Majesty the King Gustaf V from 1942 to 1950.

Wachtmeister was promoted to major in 1944 and he became major of the General Staff Corps in 1946. He served as chief of staff of the IV Military Area from 1946 to 1949 and became lieutenant colonel of General Staff Corps in 1948 and of Hälsinge Regiment (I 14) in 1949. Wachtmeister was promoted to colonel in the cavalry and appointed regimental commander of Norrland Dragoon Regiment (K 4) in 1952. Five years later, Wachtmeister was appointed Commendant of Stockholm and Defence District Commander for Stockholm Defence District (Fo 44). He attended the Swedish National Defence College in 1958 and served as Defence District Commander until 1963 when he retired from the Swedish Armed Forces. Wachtmeister then worked as an expert i preparedness issues from 1963 to 1981.

He was chairman of the Swedish Fencing Association (Svenska Fäktförbundet) from 1948 to 1952. He competed in the team sabre event at the 1936 Summer Olympics.

Personal life

In 1929, he married Birgit Thuresson (1906–1986), the daughter of the major in the Road and Waterway Construction Service Corps, Elis Thuresson and Carin Santesson. They had two children: Carl-Fredrik (born 1936) and Caroline (born 1939).

Death
Wachtmeister died on 22 May 1993 in Oscar Parish, Stockholm. He was buried on 7 July 1993 in Galärvarvskyrkogården in Stockholm.

Dates of rank
1925 – Second lieutenant 
1939 – Ryttmästare
1942 – Captain
1944 – Major
1948 – Lieutenant Colonel
1952 – Colonel

Awards and decorations

Swedish
   King Gustaf V's Jubilee Commemorative Medal (1948)
   King Gustaf V's Commemorative Medal (1951)
   Commander 1st Class of the Order of the Sword (4 June 1960)
   Knight of the Order of the Polar Star
   Knight of the Order of Vasa
  Swedish Fencing Federation Honorary Shield (Svenska fäktförbundets hederssköld) (1952)

Foreign
   Commander of the Order of St. Olav with Star
  Commander 1st Class of the Order of the Crown of Thailand
   Knight of the Order of the Dannebrog

References

External links
 

1903 births
1993 deaths
Swedish male sabre fencers
Olympic fencers of Sweden
Fencers at the 1936 Summer Olympics
People from Skövde Municipality
Commanders First Class of the Order of the Sword
Knights of the Order of the Polar Star
Knights of the Order of Vasa
Swedish counts
Burials at Galärvarvskyrkogården
Sportspeople from Västra Götaland County